Noboru Ishiguro (2 August 1932 – 11 February 2021) was a Japanese racewalker. He competed in the men's 20 kilometres walk at the 1964 Summer Olympics.

Ishiguro died on 11 February 2021 of esophageal cancer. He had been scheduled to serve as the Olympic torch carrier for Saitama Prefecture during the 2020 Summer Olympics.

References

External links
 

1932 births
2021 deaths
Athletes (track and field) at the 1964 Summer Olympics
Japanese male racewalkers
Olympic athletes of Japan
Place of birth missing
Deaths from esophageal cancer
Deaths from cancer in Japan
20th-century Japanese people